De droomkoningin is a novel by Dutch author Maarten 't Hart. It was first published in 1980.

Novels by Maarten 't Hart
1980 novels